Silchar Assembly constituency (Bengali: শিলচর বিধানসভা সমষ্টি) is one of the 126 state legislative assembly constituencies in Assam state in North Eastern India. It is also one of the 7 state legislative assembly constituencies included in the Silchar Lok Sabha constituency.

Members of Legislative Assembly

Election results

2021 results

2016 results

2014 by-election

2011 results

See also
 Silchar
 Cachar district
 List of constituencies of Assam Legislative Assembly

References

External links 
 

Assembly constituencies of Assam
Silchar